The enzyme phosphatidylinositol-3,4-bisphosphate 4-phosphatase (EC 3.1.3.66) that catalyzes the reaction

1-phosphatidyl-myo-inositol 3,4-bisphosphate + H2O  1-phosphatidyl-1D-myo-inositol 3-phosphate + phosphate

This enzyme belongs to the family of hydrolases, specifically those acting on phosphoric monoester bonds.  The systematic name is 1-phosphatidyl-1D-myo-inositol-3,4-bisphosphate 4-phosphohydrolase. Other names in common use include inositol-3,4-bisphosphate 4-phosphatase, D-myo-inositol-3,4-bisphosphate 4-phosphohydrolase, phosphoinositide 4-phosphatase, inositol polyphosphate 4-phosphatase, D-myo-inositol-3,4-bisphosphate 4-phosphohydrolase, and inositol polyphosphate 4-phosphatase type II.  This enzyme participates in inositol phosphate metabolism and phosphatidylinositol signaling system.

References

 
 
 

EC 3.1.3
Enzymes of unknown structure